Pita Gus Nacagilevu Sowakula (born 26 October 1994) is a Fijian professional rugby union footballer who plays as a flanker for New Zealand franchise Chiefs. In his youth career, he played basketball and was selected in the 2012 FIBA Oceania Under 19 Championships for Fiji.

Sowakula represents the Taranaki provincial team and made his professional debut for the union in 2017 at the age of 22. He spent a season at the Mitre 10 Cup side, before earning a short-term place in the Chiefs 2018 Super Rugby squad. He has defended the Ranfurly Shield with Taranaki in 2017 and was named Most Promising Player of the Year at the TRFU Amber and Black awards. He has scored 15 career tries in all competitions. Sowakula made his senior basketball international debut for Fiji in 2013 aged 19, becoming one of the youngest players to represent Fiji. He played in the 2013 Oceania Championships.

Early life 
Pita Gus Nacagilevu Sowakula was born on 26 October 1994 in Lautoka, a son of Selina Balenacagi and nephew of Ropate Robanakadavu. Growing up, Robanakadavu raised Sowakula when he was only eight months old after his mother was in school. He attended Suva Grammar School and Central College Lautoka, where he learned to play basketball and rugby union. After secondary school, Sowakula was chosen to play for the Nadro rugby league team that toured Brisbane and was named in the Fiji Residents representative side. He was also a member of the Fiji national sevens training squad during their preparation towards the 2016 Summer Olympics in Rio de Janeiro.

In the most part of Sowakula's early basketball career, he played predominantly as an amateur in Fiji. He featured for the Raiwaqa-based Boston White side, playing in local Fijian tournaments such as the Raiwaqa Basketball Super League. His form saw him make his international debut during the Oceania Youth Championship competition in Melbourne in 2012. He was also selected to be part of the Oceania Youth All Stars and the Oceania Open team in the same year whilst winning a bronze medal.

Basketball career

2013–15 
In 2013, Sowakula was a member of the Fijian national basketball team that took part in the Oceania Championships in New Zealand where he was also awarded the best player of the tournament, making the competitions All Stars side. His performances during the competition led to him being scouted by Iowa Central Community College for the following year. He joined siblings Milika and Mataika Koyamainavure after Fiji Basketball development officer Laisiasa Puamau confirmed the news in May 2014.

Sowakula was brought into the Otago Nuggets to participate in their 2014 campaign after a respectable showing at the Oceania Championships in New Zealand. Player-coach, Mark Dickel decided to sign Sowakula to the squad as they were looking for a replacement for fellow Fijian, Marques Whippy. He suited up for the Nuggets during their match against the Taranaki Mountainairs after arriving in Dunedin the week before. He didn't live quite up to Dickel's standards after he stated his belief that Sowakula was not ready for the New Zealand National Basketball League, and instead called in former representative Tom Rowe as cover. Sowakula did not make his debut for the Nuggets.

2015 saw Fiji name a strong squad to compete in the Pacific Games in Port Moresby, Papua New Guinea in July. The side included the services of Sowakula. They defeated Papua New Guinea in the semi-final, giving them a chance to reach the World Championship Asia qualifiers. Sowakula and experienced players Marques Whippy and Joshua Fox stood out after putting together a good combination of tactics which was too much for their opposition to handle. Overall, Sowakula won a silver medal after Fiji lost to Guam in the final.

Rugby career

2016–18 
Sowakula arrived in New Zealand from Fiji at the end of 2016 after his agent promised a deal with Taranaki Rugby to place him in the union's academy. Originally a winger, he converted to the back row and represented the side's development team as they went through their representative season unbeaten, winning the northern regions competition in the process. After a stand-out year and being named one of the club players of the year for Spotswood United Rugby Club, Sowakula earned his call-up into the Taranaki Mitre 10 Cup side for their 2017 campaign. He made his debut for the province, making the match-day fifteen at blindside flanker against Waikato. Sowakula took time to adjust but produced some stand-out displays, starting in all nine appearances and scoring three tries. He also was a part of Taranaki's historic Ranfurly Shield victory over Canterbury and their impressive top of the table finish. At seasons-end Sowakula was awarded most promising player of the year for the union.

Sowakula was signed short-term for the Chiefs in their 2018 Super Rugby season. He joined during the sides injury crisis after season-ending injuries to Dominic Bird, Mitchell Brown and Fin Hoeata. Sowakula was named in the reserves against the Highlanders in Hamilton in cover of locks Brodie Retallick and Tyler Ardron. He made his first appearance in the competition replacing Liam Messam in the 66th minute. Sowakula made a further six appearances for the franchise.

In August 2018, Sowakula returned to play for Taranaki in a Ranfurly Shield defense against Manawatu. He was involved in an accidental head collision with Counties Manukau captain Sam Henwood in Pukekohe. Sowakula was unaffected by the incident but Henwood was taken to the hospital after suffering a concussion. He was later ruled out for the remainder of the season after sustaining a minor shoulder injury. Sowakula received three Duane Monkley Medal points for his performance against Auckland but featured in a disappointing Taranaki campaign that finished in last place.

2019–present 
Sowakula rejoined the Chiefs squad for their upcoming season after head coach Colin Cooper named his inclusion during the 2019 Super Rugby side announcement in October 2018. He made consecutive appearances from the reserves and started at both flanker and number 8 after being called up midway through the year once recovered from an injury that had him earlier sidelined. Sowakula scored his maiden Super Rugby try against the Reds in Hamilton and lead the game in most individual tackles with 25. He was also named in SANZAAR round fifteen team of the week after making the most tackles of any player, scoring a try and was the only forward in the round to make multiple clean breaks in his performance against the Reds.

Near the end of his second season with the Chiefs, Sowakula made comment on possible selection for the Fiji national team for their 2019 Rugby World Cup squad. After discussions with coach John McKee, he chose not to make himself available. In August 2019, he received player of the match and picked up three Duane Monkley Medal points in his return to the Mitre 10 Cup competition with Taranaki against Manawatu. He would later overcome a minor injury sustained against Northland to be reselected for a Ranfurly Shield challenge against Otago midway into the season. Sowakula scored his fourth domestic try in a defeat to Waikato in Hamilton.

Statistics 

Updated: 12 June 2022
Source: Pita G Sowakula Rugby History

References

External links 
 

1994 births
Living people
Sportspeople from Lautoka
Fijian rugby union players
Fijian men's basketball players
Fijian expatriate basketball people in New Zealand
Chiefs (rugby union) players
Taranaki rugby union players
Rugby union flankers
Centers (basketball)
Moana Pasifika players
Rugby union number eights
New Zealand rugby union players
New Zealand international rugby union players